The Gunicorn "Green Unicorn" (pronounced jee-unicorn or gun-i-corn) is a Python Web Server Gateway Interface (WSGI) HTTP server. It is a pre-fork worker model, ported from Ruby's Unicorn project. The Gunicorn server is broadly compatible with a number of web frameworks, simply implemented, light on server resources and fairly fast. It is often paired with NGINX, as the two have complementary features.

Architecture 
Server model 
 Central master process to manage the workers
 Requests are handled by worker processes
 Components:
 Master
 Sync workers
 Async workers
 Tornado workers
 AsyncIO workers

Features 

 Natively supports WSGI, web2py, Django and Paster
 Automatic worker process management
 Simple Python configuration
 Multiple worker configurations
 Various server hooks for extensibility
 Compatible with Python 2.6+ and Python 3.2+

See also

 Comparison of web server software
 Comparison of application servers

References

External links
 
 PyPI listings

Free web server software
Free software programmed in Python
Web server software for Linux